is a 2016 Japanese drama film written and directed by Shunji Iwai, based on his novel of the same name.

Synopsis 
Nanami is an apathetic, part-time junior high school teacher, whose only solace comes from connecting with others on "Planet", a new social network service. One day, a young man named Tetsuya messages her and asks to meet in person. The two begin dating and quickly become engaged. When Tetsuya begs Nanami to increase her guest list for the wedding, Nanami reaches out to her online-friend, Amuro, a self-proclaimed jack-of-all-trades, who hires actors to play Nanami's guests on her big day. A few weeks following the ceremony, Tetsuya's mother confronts Nanami with allegations of lying and cheating. Heartbroken and depressed, Nanami checks herself into a hotel and manages to get hired there as a maid. One day, Amuro offers Nanami a housekeeping job in an old mansion, whose sole resident's infectious spirit helps Nanami to open her heart. However, Nanami soon realizes that Amuro, the mansion, and its occupant aren't what they seem - and even dreams have limits.

Cast 
 Haru Kuroki
 Gō Ayano
 Cocco
 Go Jibiki
 Hideko Hara
 Soko Wada
 Tomoko Mariya
 Akio Kaneda
 Lily

Release 
After the film had its world premiere in Hong Kong on March 8, 2016, A Bride for Rip Van Winkle was released in Taiwan on March 11, 2016 and in Hong Kong on March 17, 2016, ahead of its release in Japan on March 26, 2016. The film was released in the United States on November 10, 2017

A Bride for Rip Van Winkle was an official selection of numerous international film festivals:
 2016 Seattle International Film Festival
 2016 New York Asian Film Festival
 2016 Shanghai International Film Festival
 2016 Fantasia International Film Festival
 2016 Tokyo International Film Festival
 2016 Hawaii International Film Festival
 2017 International Film Festival Rotterdam

Versions 
Two versions of A Bride for Rip Van Winkle were available for theatrical release, a 179-minute "director's cut" and a 119-minute theatrical version. Only the longer version was released in Japan, while both versions were available selectively for international release. Both versions were released in Hong Kong, whereas only the director's cut was released in the United States.

The film was also broadcast as a four-and-a-half-hour, six-episode television series ("serial edition") on the Japanese SKY PerfecTV! service's BS SKY PerfecTV! channel. While retaining the same story and plot, this television series is an alternate version of the film, with extensions for some scenes added and some scenes removed.

Iwai prefers the longer theatrical version, though he has stated that it is "not perfect. Even the TV version, the longest, isn't perfect because it doesn't have a very, very important scene in the climax. You can only see that in the three-hour version."

Accolades 
 2016 41st Hochi Film Award
 Gō Ayano - Best Supporting Actor (winner)
 2017 31st Takasaki Film Festival
 Lily - Best Supporting Actress (winner)
 2017 Kinema Junpo
 Best 10 Japanese Movies of 2016 (ranked 6th)
 2017 38th Yokohama Film Festival
 Best 10 Japanese Movies of 2016 (runner-up)
 2017 71st Mainichi Film Awards
 Haru Kuroki - Best Actress (nominated)
 59th Blue Ribbon Awards
 Best Film (nominated)
 Haru Kuroki - Best Actress (nominated)
 Gō Ayano - Best Supporting Actor (nominated)
 Shunji Iwai - Best Director (nominated)
 2017 40th Japan Academy Prize
 Haru Kuroki - Outstanding Performance by an Actress in a Leading Role (nominated)
 2017 11th Asian Film Awards
 Haru Kuroki - Best Actress (nominated)
 Kyôko Heya - Best Production Design (nominated)

References

External links 
  
  
 
 
 
 

Films directed by Shunji Iwai
2010s Japanese-language films
Japanese LGBT-related films
Japanese mystery films
Films about social media
2016 films
Films produced by Shunji Iwai
Japanese drama films
Japanese romance films
2010s Japanese films